Imlay Shire was a local government area in the South Coast region of New South Wales, Australia.

Imlay Shire was proclaimed on 7 March 1906, one of 134 shires created after the passing of the Local Government (Shires) Act 1905. 

The shire office was in Eden. Other towns and villages in the shire include Candelo, Merimbula, Pambula and Tathra. 

In 1961 Imlay Shire had a population of 5283. 

Imlay Shire was amalgamated with Mumbulla Shire and the Municipality of Bega on 1 January 1981 to create Bega Valley Shire per the Local Government Areas Amalgamation Act 1980.

References

Former local government areas of New South Wales
1906 establishments in Australia
1981 disestablishments in Australia